The flag of Tulsa consists of an upper navy blue half and a lower beige half, separated by a gold horizontal line, with a gold Osage shield punctuating the left third. The shield contains a red circle, and a beige six-pointed star centered within the circle. The flag is notable for being one of the few modern flags to utilize beige in its design - a color often associated with faded dyes on flags from usage.

Symbolism
The navy blue field represents the Arkansas River, which flows through the city.

The gold line represents the "black gold" discovered in the region in 1901 that led to economic prosperity.

The shield is a simplified version of the shield on the Oklahoma state flag and represents Native Americans forcefully relocated to the Indian Territory.

The red circle represents the blood of the victims of the Tulsa race massacre and the star represents the future of the city.

The beige lower field represents warmth and community.

History

1924–1941 flag

Tulsa's first flag was a non-rectangular design with the fly ending in an isosceles triangle. It consisted of a white field with a large red circle in the center with the word "Tulsa" inside. From the red circle emanate eight blue rays and six white rays. In the broader white sections are two red arrows pointing inward, with the words "Unlimited" on the hoist and "Opportunity" on the fly, both in white and in capital letters. The design suggests the brashness of early Tulsa as it grew rapidly with the petroleum industry, attracting visitors, settlers, and businesses, loudly proclaiming a bright future for all. This was adopted on June 5, 1924, during Herman F. Newblock's mayorship and designed by Alfred Perry. W. A. (Rose) Cease sewed the first flag.

1941–1973 flag

Tulsa's second flag consisted of an encircled star containing a globe circumscribed with the words "Tulsa Oklahoma" in capital letters. This was adopted on September 27, 1941, during Clarence H. Veale's mayorship.

1973–2018 flag

The next most recent flag consists of an upper one-third and two lower quadrants to form the letter "T." The flag was adopted on August 17, 1973, as part of a celebration of the city's 75th anniversary.

2018 flag
In 2017, a group of private citizens organized an effort to design a new flag for the city of Tulsa. The effort, called the Tulsa Flag Project, received nearly 400 design submissions, of which three were chosen as finalists. Of the more than 8,000 votes cast by citizens on these finalists, 51% were for the winning design.

The winning design was released under a CC0 license (an equivalent to being in the public domain), encouraging local creators to make their interpretations of the flag. Local citizens and businesses have widely embraced the design, and it is flown throughout Tulsa. The city council officially approved the design by unanimous vote on October 3, 2018.

Protocol

Pantone matching system
{| class="wikitable" style="text-align:left"
|-
! colspan=2|Description || Number || RGB || CMYK || HSV || Hex
|-
|style="background:#162b49"|  || National Flag Blue || 289 C || 22-43-73 || 96-83-44-43 || 215-070-029 || #162B49
|-
|style="background:#ebad21"| || Mustard || 130 C || 235-173-33 || 7-33-100-0 || 042-086-092 || #EBAD21
|-
|style="background:#f8f1e0"| || Bone || 468 C || 248-241-224 || 2-3-11-0 ||  042-010-097 || #F8F1E0
|-
|style="background:#c6202e"| || Bright Red || 186 C || 198-32-46 || 15-100-91-5 ||  355-084-078 || #C6202E
|-
|}

References

Flag
Flags of cities in Oklahoma
Flags introduced in 1924
Flags introduced in 1941
Flags introduced in 1973
Flags introduced in 2018